Point of Betrayal is a 1995 American thriller film about a man (Rick Johnson) trying to drive his mother (Dina Merrill) insane in order to get her money. The film was directed by Richard Martini and produced by Jonathan D. Krane.

Premise
A man (Rick Johnson) tries to drive his mother (Dina Merrill) insane in order to get her money. He hires a nurse (Rebecca Broussard) for his mother but faces opposition from his stepfather (Rod Taylor).

Cast
 Dina Merrill as Mother
 Rick Johnson as Son
 Rod Taylor as Ted Kittridge, as Stepfather
 Rebecca Broussard as Monet Fletcher, as Nurse
 Ann Cusack

Production
At the request of the director, Rod Taylor assisted writing some scenes and helped choreograph a fight between himself and Johnson.

References

External links

American mystery films
1995 films
1990s English-language films
1990s American films